Joshua J. Kroeger (born August 31, 1982) is a former Major League Baseball outfielder. Listed at 6'3" , 220 pounds , Kroeger batted and threw left-handed. He was born in Davenport, Iowa.

High school career
Kroeger graduated from Scripps Ranch High School in 2000, where he was named to the Third Team All-American.

Professional career
In  Kroeger played for the Chicago Cubs Triple-A affiliate, the Iowa Cubs. He became a free agent at the end of the season and signed a minor league contract with the Chicago White Sox. Additionally, he played three winter ball seasons for the Leones del Caracas club of the Venezuelan Professional Baseball League, resulting champion in the 2009-2010 season and being a key part in the team's regular lineup.

Kroeger batted an average of .167 (9-for-54) with three doubles in 22 games for Arizona, including five runs scored and two RBI without home runs.

In 13 minor league seasons, Kroeger hit .276 with 154 home runs and 743 RBI in 1,434 games. His most productive seasons came in Venezuela, where he was widely known as 'La Pesadilla' (The Nightmare), primarily due to his clutch hitting ability for delivering a game-winning hit or belting a home run against the opposite team, as well as for the phonetic similarity of his surname to the fictional character Freddy Krueger. Overall, he posted a .297/.401/.482 slash line with 27 homers and 128 RBI in 224 games during his five-season stint in the league.

Besides Caracas, Kroeger played with the Águilas del Zulia and Bravos de Margarita and served as a reinforcement for the Caribes de Anzoátegui in the 2010-2011 postseason, when he earned Most Valuable Player honors.

Sources

External links

1982 births
Living people
Águilas del Zulia players
Arizona Diamondbacks players
Arizona League Diamondbacks players
Baseball players from Iowa
Bravos de Margarita players
Charlotte Knights players
El Paso Diablos players
Gwinnett Braves players
Iowa Cubs players
Lancaster JetHawks players
Leones del Caracas players
American expatriate baseball players in Venezuela
Major League Baseball outfielders
New Orleans Zephyrs players
Pawtucket Red Sox players
Scottsdale Scorpions players
Scranton/Wilkes-Barre Red Barons players
Somerset Patriots players
South Bend Silver Hawks players
Sportspeople from Davenport, Iowa
Tennessee Smokies players
Tucson Sidewinders players